Johanna Bordewijk-Roepman (4 August 1892 – 8 October 1971) was a Dutch composer. She was born in Rotterdam, and began composing in 1917 without instruction. In 1937 she studied orchestration with Eduard Flipse and became successful as a composer in the 1940s and 1950s.

In August 1914 she married writer Ferdinand Bordewijk, who contributed lyrics to some of her works, and had a son Robert and daughter Nina. She received an award in 1943 for her Piano Sonata and died in The Hague.

Works
Selected works include:
Variations II, op. 6 for piano (1919)
The Garden of Allah for orchestra, after novel by Robert Smythe Hitchens (1936)
Polish Suite for orchestra (1937)
Sextet in C major for wind instruments (1938)
Elog du Vent, text Adolphe Retté, for soprano solo, female choir and orchestra (1939)
Piano Concerto in A-flat major (1940)
Les Illuminations, text Arthur Rimbaud, for voice and orchestra (1940)
Roundabout, opera/operetta in a company, libretto F. Bordewijk (1941)
Symphony (1942)
Sonata in E major for piano (1943)
Epilogue for orchestra (1943)
Mother of the Fatherland, for the 50-year jubilee of Queen Wilhelmina (1948)
Plato's death, words F. Bordewijk, symphonic poem for narrator, solo voice, chorus and symphony orchestra (1949)
Praeludium and Fugue for carillon (1950)
The sacred circle for four-voice choir (1950)
Triptych for carillon (1951)
Roepman, for voice unaccompanied (1953)
Reconstruction for four- male chorus a cappella (1954)
The moon, text Emily Dickinson, for chorus a cappella (1961)

References

External links
Catalog of works
Donemus composer page

1892 births
1971 deaths
20th-century classical composers
Dutch women classical composers
Musicians from Rotterdam
Dutch classical composers
Composers for carillon
20th-century women composers